Kohneh Qaleh may refer to:
 Kohneh Qaleh, West Azerbaijan

See also
 Qaleh-ye Kohneh (disambiguation)